The following highways are numbered 424:

Canada
Manitoba Provincial Road 424

Japan
 Japan National Route 424

United States
  Louisiana Highway 424
  Maryland Route 424
  New York State Route 424 (former)
  Ohio State Route 424 (former)
  Pennsylvania Route 424
  Puerto Rico Highway 424
  Farm to Market Road 424